As the Light Does the Shadow is the fifth studio album by the Norwegian funeral doom band Funeral. It was released on September 22, 2008. It is their first album to be released through Indie Recordings.

Track listing
 "The Will to Die" - 6:18
 "Those Fated to Fall" - 7:31
 "The Strength to End It" - 7:31
 "The Elusive Light" - 6:32
 "In the Fathoms of Wit and Reason" - 8:00
 "Towards the End" - 7:14
 "Let Us Die Alone" - 6:59
 "The Absence of Heaven" - 8:14
 "Hunger" - 9:17
 "Fallen One" - 4:18

Personnel

Line-up
Anders Eek - drums
Frode Forsmo - vocals, bass
Mats Lerberg - guitar, vocals
Erlend E. Nybø - guitar

Session musician
Jon Borgerud - synthesizer

Guest musician
Robert Lowe - vocals on "In the Fathoms of Wit and Reason"

References

2008 albums
Funeral (band) albums